Heather Ross-McManus (born September 3, 1973) is a Canadian trampoline gymnast.

After representing Canada internationally in trampolining at 3 World Trampoline Championships, she retired from competition in 1993. However, she returned to trampoline in 1997, represented Canada at 4 more World Championships, and qualified for the Canadian Olympic team in 2004.

She won a bronze medal in the Team event and placed 5th in individual trampoline at the 2003 World Championships in Hannover, Germany. In the 2004 Summer Olympic Games she finished in 6th place. In the December 2004 Trampoline World Cup Final, held in Algiers, she finished in 6th place in the individual competition and 4th in the synchronized competition with her partner Karen Cockburn.

Ross-McManus lives in Ottawa, Ontario where she runs Spring Action, a trampoline club, with her husband. In 2005, she retired again from competing but has stayed involved in the sport of trampoline as a coach and judge.

References

External links
Ross-McManus Olympic record

1973 births
Living people
Canadian female trampolinists
Olympic gymnasts of Canada
Gymnasts at the 2004 Summer Olympics
Gymnasts from Toronto
Sportspeople from Etobicoke